Johnny Mooney (21 Dec  1958) is an Irish retired Gaelic footballer. His league and championship career with the Offaly senior team spanned eighteen seasons from 1976 to 1992.

Mooney made his senior debut for Offaly during the 1976 championship becoming the youngest player ever to play for the county.

Over the course of the next eighteen seasons he won one All-Ireland medal in 1982. Mooney also won three Leinster Senior Football Championship medals. He played his last game for Offaly in November 1992.

During his Offaly career he also won two Leinster U21 medals.  He also played on three winning "Rest of Ireland" vs Kerry games.  He also played against Kerry for the San Francisco Allstars in 1981 in Balboa Stadium.  He was a player-manager for Warwickshire GAA when they won the British Championship in the early nineties.  He also trained and played hurling with John Mitchel's Hurling Club Birminghman and played hurling for Warickshire.

Bono famously wore Johnny’s Offaly jersey during a concert in Germany back In 1983.

Honours

Offaly
All-Ireland Senior Football Championship (1): 1982
Leinster Senior Football Championship (3): 1980, 1981, 1982

References

1958 births
Living people
Rhode Gaelic footballers
Offaly inter-county Gaelic footballers
Winners of one All-Ireland medal (Gaelic football)